Clarke County is a county located in the southwestern part of the U.S. state of Alabama. As of the 2020 census, the population was 23,087. The county seat is Grove Hill.  The county's largest city is Jackson. The county was created  by the legislature of the Mississippi Territory in 1812. It is named in honor of General John Clarke of Georgia, who was later elected governor of that state.

The county museum is housed in the Alston-Cobb House in Grove Hill.

History

Pre-European era
For thousands of years, this area was occupied along the rivers by varying cultures of indigenous peoples.  At the time of European encounter, Clarke County was the traditional home of the Choctaw and the Creek people. They traded with the French, who had settlements in Mobile and New Orleans. They also were reached by some English and Scots traders from the British colonies along the Atlantic Coast.  After the Louisiana Purchase, they started to establish relations with the United States.

In 1805, by the Treaty of Mount Dexter, the Choctaw conveyed large amounts of land in what is now southeastern Mississippi and southwestern Alabama, including much of the western portion of Clarke County, to the United States for settlement by European Americans.

Modern era
Clarke County was established on December 10, 1812, by the Mississippi Territory. The county had numerous forts, built by settlers for protection during the Creek War (1813–1814). Some of these forts included: Fort Carney, Fort Easley, Fort Glass, Fort Landrum, Fort Madison, and Fort Sinquefield. The first county seat was Clarkesville, founded in 1820.  The seat was moved to Macon, later renamed Grove Hill, in 1831. During the American Civil War, the county was notable for its salt production.

In 1883, the U.S. Supreme Court upheld the conviction of Tony Pace and Mary Cox for interracial dating, in Pace v. Alabama. That precedent was subsequently overturned. In 1892, Clarke County was the scene of a violent confrontation around economic divides that later became known as the Mitcham War.

Alcohol prohibition
Following the national repeal of prohibition in 1933, Clarke County voted to become a dry county in 1937, when wet-dry counties were established in Alabama.

In the first decade of the 21st century, the county's largest communities voted to legalize alcohol sales: Jackson on May 10, 2005; Thomasville on August 14, 2007; and Grove Hill on November 3, 2009.

Geography
It is the third-largest county in Alabama by land area and the fourth-largest by total area.

Major highways

 U.S. Highway 43
 U.S. Highway 84
 State Route 5
 State Route 69
 State Route 154
 State Route 177
 State Route 178
 State Route 295

Adjacent counties
Marengo County (north)
Wilcox County (northeast)
Monroe County (east)
Baldwin County (south)
Washington County (southwest)
Choctaw County (northwest)

Demographics

2020

As of the 2020 United States census, there were 23,087 people, 9,090 households, and 5,662 families residing in the county.

2010
According to the 2010 United States census:

54.5% White
43.9% Black
0.4%  Native American
0.3% Asian 
0.0% Native Hawaiian or Pacific Islander 
0.7% Two or more races
1.0% Hispanic or Latino (of any race)

2000
As of the census of 2000, there were 27,867 people, 10,578 households, and 7,700 families residing in the county.  The population density was 22 people per square mile (9/km2).  There were 12,631 housing units at an average density of 10 per square mile (4/km2).  The racial makeup of the county was 55.94% White, 43.02% Black or African American, 0.22% Native American, 0.16% Asian, 0.16% from other races, and 0.49% from two or more races.  Nearly 0.65% of the population were Hispanic or Latino of any race.

There were 10,578 households, out of which 35.40% had children under the age of 18 living with them; 53.90% were married couples living together, 15.70% had a female householder with no husband present, and 27.20% were non-families. Nearly 25.50% of all households were made up of individuals, and 11.90% had someone living alone who was 65 years of age or older.  The average household size was 2.60, and the average family size was 3.13.

In Clarke County, the population was spread out, with 28.00% under the age of 18, 8.50% from 18 to 24, 27.50% from 25 to 44, 22.50% from 45 to 64, and 13.50% who were 65 years of age or older.  The median age was 36 years. For every 100 females, there were 89.70 males.  For every 100 females age 18 and over, there were 84.60 males.

The median income for a household in the county was $27,388, and the median income for a family was $34,546. Males had a median income of $34,111 versus $19,075 for females. The per capita income for the county was $14,581.  About 18.10% of families and 22.60% of the population were below the poverty line, including 29.60% of those under age 18 and 23.80% of those age 65 or over.

Education 
Clarke County contains two public school districts. There are approximately 3,400 students in public PK-12 schools in Clarke County.

Districts 
School districts include:

 Clarke County School District
 Thomasville City School District

Government
Since 1960, the majority of Clarke County voters has mostly supported Republican candidates for the presidency, but party affiliations have changed. Prior to the civil rights era, most whites were members of the Democratic Party, although they began to vote for Nixon and other Republican presidential candidates.

After the Civil War, many African Americans had joined the Republican Party, but they were essentially disenfranchised around the turn of the 20th century by state changes to its constitution and laws, making voter registration more difficult. After they regained their ability to vote through national legislation in the mid-1960s, they largely joined the Democratic Party, which had supported their effort to regain their constitutional civil rights.

Most conservative whites gradually left that party and joined the Republican Party. Voting and party affiliation in Clarke County, as throughout much of Alabama, is aligned by ethnicity, with conservative whites, the majority, voting for Republican candidates and African Americans supporting Democratic candidates.

For some positions, white voters have sometimes continued to vote for state-level Democrats, such as Doug Jones in 2017.

Communities

Cities
Jackson
Thomasville

Towns
Coffeeville
Fulton
Grove Hill (county seat)

Census Designated Places
Carlton
Rockville
Whatley

Unincorporated communities

Alma
Antioch
Barlow Bend
Bashi
Campbell
Dickinson
Gainestown
Gosport
McEntyre
Morvin
Opine
Salitpa
Suggsville
Tallahatta Springs
Tattlersville
Walker Springs

Former communities
Choctaw Corner
Clarkesville
Failetown

Notable Person
 Martha Loftin Wilson (1834–1919), missionary worker, journal editor, heroine of the American Civil War

See also
National Register of Historic Places listings in Clarke County, Alabama
Properties on the Alabama Register of Landmarks and Heritage in Clarke County, Alabama

References

External links
 Clarke County Alabama Official Site
 Clarke County map of roads/towns (map  2007 Univ. of Alabama).
 Coastal Gateway Regional Economic Development Alliance
 South Alabama Community Website
 Digital Alabama: Clarke County Alabama History

 
1812 establishments in Mississippi Territory
Populated places established in 1812